The culture of Louisiana involves its music, food, religion, clothing, language, architecture, art, literature, games, and sports. Often, these elements are the basis for one of the many festivals in the state. Louisiana, while sharing many similarities to its neighbors along the Gulf Coast, is unique in the influence of Louisiana French culture, due to the historical waves of immigration of French-speaking settlers to Louisiana. Likewise, African-American culture plays a prominent role. While New Orleans, as the largest city, has had an outsize influence on Louisiana throughout its history, other regions both rural and urban have contributed their shared histories and identities to the culture of the state.

Religion
The first non-Native American religion in Louisiana was Roman Catholicism, as a result of the predominantly Catholic French and Spanish control of colonial Louisiana. After the Louisiana Purchase in 1803, Protestantism was introduced to the territory. Methodists, Baptists, and Presbyterians were later joined by other Protestant sects such as Lutherans, who were often German immigrants. Louisiana remains a cultural pot with many different religions. More recent immigrants have brought Buddhism and Islam, etc. into Louisiana. Also, Voodoo is often practiced in south Louisiana, especially in New Orleans.

Arts

Music
New Orleans is the birthplace of jazz. Jazz is a kind of music with strong rhythms and much syncopation, often improvised. Brass bands and piano players helped create this new sound. Louisiana blues is also a link to the past musical culture.

The early Cajuns often held dance parties in their rural homes. Entire families came, and the young children were put on blanket pallets in the bedroom. They were told to go to sleep, which in French is fais-do-do. This became the name of these dance parties, and today the term fais-do-do refers to a Cajun dance.

Zydeco is the special type of music of French-speaking Louisiana Creoles of South Louisiana. It is much like Cajun music; the song is sung in French and played on an accordion. An added instrument, the rub-board is used for rhythm.

Country music is part of the heritage of North Louisiana. In the days before television, when people gathered for entertainment, musicians brought their instruments. Their string bands usually included a guitar, a fiddle, and a mandolin. This traditional southern country music developed into bluegrass music and then into modern country music. This heritage continues with a state fiddling championship held each year at Marthaville in Natchitoches Parish.

Many early rock-and-roll musicians started out singing gospel music in the state. Gospel is church music that blends elements of folk music, spirituals, hymns, and popular music.

More formal classical music also contributes to the musical sound of Louisiana. Orchestras have created musical culture since colonial days. Young musicians today continue this tradition as they audition for the Louisiana Youth Orchestra in Baton Rouge.

Another variety of music that is heard commonly between the Gonzales, Baton Rouge and Hammond areas is Swamp pop.

Food
The state is predominantly known for both its Cajun cuisine, Creole cuisine, and Native American cuisine.

Creole cuisine is influenced by traditional French cooking with Spanish, African, and Indian influences. Cajun cuisine is one of the most popular cuisines in the United States. People in Southern Louisiana say that others eat to live, while they live to eat.

Although the food most identified with the state is the Cajun and Creole food of South Louisiana, North Louisiana also has its own unique cuisine. Traditionally, southern style soul food such as smothered pork chops, chicken and dumplings, candied yams, hot water cornbread, fried chicken, macaroni and cheese, collard greens, and black-eyed peas are commonly eaten in North Louisiana. Natchitoches is famous for its meat pie.  For many years, crawfish were not eaten outside of Cajun country. People north of Alexandria were more likely to eat fried chicken or barbecue. Fish fries featuring catfish took the place of crawfish boils. Today, boiled crawfish is served throughout the state.

Other foods popular in Louisiana include gumbo, etouffée, jambalaya, muffuletta, po'boy, and red beans and rice. Seafood is especially popular in Louisiana either as an ingredient or as a main dish such as shrimp, crawfish, crabs, oysters and catfish. Swamp denizens such as gator, frog legs, and turtle soup is popular around the bayous of south Louisiana.

Famous desserts and snacks include king cake, beignets, pralines, sweet potato pie and pecan pie.

Festivals and carnivals

Louisiana is known for many festivals such as the New Orleans Jazz & Heritage Festival, Bayou Country Superfest, Essence Music Festival, Festival International, Voodoo Experience and its most famous, Mardi Gras. Other popular festivals throughout the state include the Alligator Festival, Andouille Festival in LaPlace, Bridge City Gumbo Festival, Etoufee Festival in Arnaudville, French Quarter Festival, Gretna Heritage Festival, International Rice Festival, Jambalaya Festival in Gonzales, Louisiana Cajun Food Festival in Kaplan, Louisiana Catfish Festival, Louisiana Crawfish Festival in Breaux Bridge, Louisiana Pecan Festival in Colfax, Louisiana Seafood Festival in New Orleans, Louisiana Shrimp & Petroleum Festival in Morgan City, Louisiana Sugar Cane Festival in New Iberia, Louisiana Watermelon Festival in Farmerville, Mudbug Maddness in Shreveport, Natchitoches Christmas Festival, Natchitoches Meat Pie Festival, Natchitoches-NSU Folk Festival, New Orleans Oyster Festival, New Orleans Po-Boy Preservation Festival, Orange Festival in Buras, Ponchatoula Strawberry Festival, Rayne Frog Festival, Red River Revel, Satchmo SummerFest, Southern Decadence, State Fair of Louisiana in Shreveport, Zwolle Hot Tamale festival in Zwolle, Tales of the Cocktail in New Orleans, Tennessee Williams/New Orleans Literary Festival and Yambilee Festival. Annual crawfish boils and crawfish cook-offs are also popular.

Sports
Sports are very popular in Louisiana. American football is the most popular sport throughout the state. Other popular athletic sports include basketball and baseball. Also, recreational sports such as hunting and fishing are also popular. Because of this, the state is often called "Sportsman's Paradise" locally. Since 1958, the Louisiana Sports Hall of Fame has honored the elite figures in state sports history. The state has many sports teams for high school, college and professional athletes.

Professional
New Orleans Saints (NFL) - New Orleans
New Orleans Pelicans (NBA) - New Orleans

College
Grambling State Tigers - Grambling
Louisiana–Lafayette Ragin' Cajuns - Lafayette
Louisiana–Monroe Warhawks - Monroe
Louisiana Tech Bulldogs and Lady Techsters - Ruston
LSU Tigers - Baton Rouge
McNeese State Cowboys and Cowgirls - Lake Charles
New Orleans Privateers - New Orleans
Nicholls State Colonels - Thibodaux
Northwestern State Demons - Natchitoches
Southeastern Louisiana Lions - Hammond
Southern Jaguars - Baton Rouge
Tulane Green Wave - New Orleans

High school
Louisiana High School Athletic Association

Stadiums and arenas

Mercedes-Benz Superdome 
Ace W. Mumford Stadium
Alario Center
Baton Rouge River Center Arena
BREC Memorial Stadium
Burton Coliseum
Cajundome
Cajun Field
CenturyLink Center
Cowboy Stadium
Eddie Robinson Stadium
F.G. Clark Center
Fant–Ewing Coliseum
Fredrick C. Hobdy Assembly Center 
Harang Jr. Municipal Auditorium
Harry Turpin Stadium
Hirsch Memorial Coliseum
Houma Terrebonne Civic Center
Ike Hamilton Expo Center
Independence Stadium
Joe Aillet Stadium
Lakefront Arena
Lamar Dixon Expo Center 
Malone Stadium
Manning Field at John L. Guidry Stadium
Monroe Civic Center
Pete Maravich Assembly Center
Pontchartrain Center
Prather Coliseum
Rapides Parish Coliseum
Smoothie King Center
Stopher Gym
Strawberry Stadium
Sudduth Coliseum
Tad Gormley Stadium
Thomas Assembly Center
Tiger Stadium
University Center
Yulman Stadium
Zephyr Field

References

Louisian